Chaulnes is a commune in the Somme department in Hauts-de-France in northern France.

Geography

Chaulnes lies in the eastern part of the Somme department, 13 km north of Roye. The Chaulnes station is served by local trains between Amiens and Laon.

Demography

Culture
Chaulnes is noted for its cultural events, especially the heavy metal music festival Chaulnes Metal Fest (previously known as Killer Fest before 2008). Each year, more than 500 fans turn up to see and listen to bands like Obituary, Sodom, Rage or Nashville Pussy.

Personalities
 Charles François Lhomond, grammarian and wit, born at Chaulnes 1727, died in Paris 1794.
 The duchy of Chaulnes was established in 1621 for the Albert family.

Places and monuments
 The statue of grammarian Lhomond, sculpted by Eugène-Louis Lequesne, in 1860, paid for by public subscription..

See also
Communes of the Somme department
Réseau des Bains de Mer

References

External links

 Chaulnes on the website of l'Institut géographique national
 L'histoire Chaulnes (plain text)

Communes of Somme (department)